The 1950–51 San Jose State Spartans men's basketball team represented San Jose State College during the 1950–51 NCAA Division I men's basketball season. The Spartans were led by eighth-year head coach Walt McPherson and played their home games at the Spartan Gym. SJSU played as an Independent.

The Spartans finished 18–12 overall. The Spartans were invited and participated in the 1951 NCAA basketball tournament, where they lost to BYU in Kansas City, Missouri in the Sweet Sixteen.

Roster

Walt McPherson, alumnus of San José State, was the Spartans' head coach in 1950–51.

Schedule

|-
!colspan=12 style=| Regular Season

|-
!colspan=12 style=| NCAA tournament

References

San Jose State Spartans men's basketball seasons
San Jose State
San Jose State